Glenea cardinalis is a species of beetle in the family Cerambycidae. It was described by Thomson in 1860. It is known from India, Cambodia, and Myanmar.

References

cardinalis
Beetles described in 1860